Linea nigra (Latin for "black line"), often referred to as a pregnancy line, is a linear hyperpigmentation that commonly appears on the abdomen. The brownish streak is usually about a centimeter (0.4 in) in width. The line runs vertically along the midline of the abdomen from the pubis to the umbilicus, but can also run from the pubis to the top of the abdomen.

For pregnant women, linea nigra is attributed to increased melanocyte-stimulating hormone made by the placenta, which also causes melasma and darkened nipples. Fair-skinned women show this phenomenon less often than women with darker pigmentation. Linea nigra typically disappears within a few months after delivery.

Although linea nigra is rarely discussed outside pregnancy, males and females of all ages may have it. Except in pregnancy, both sexes have highest and equal prevalence of linea nigra from age 11 to 15. This increase in prevalence could be the result of hormonal changes during puberty. After age 15, the prevalence of linea nigra in males declines. In females it is often just a sign of unusually high benign estrogens. The prevalence for both sexes drops to below 10% after age 30. Additionally, it can appear after a short-interval weight gain. It may also be a sign of hormonal imbalance, genetic disease, cancer, inflammation and even fungal infection.

Additional images

See also
 Chadwick's sign
 Linea alba
 List of cutaneous conditions
 Perineal raphe

References

Pregnancy-related cutaneous conditions
Disturbances of human pigmentation
Medical signs
Human pregnancy
Pathology of pregnancy, childbirth and the puerperium